Tadeusz Ferenc (10 February 1940 – 27 August 2022) was a Polish economist and politician. He served as a member of Sejm from 2001 to 2002.

Ferenc was born in Rzeszów on 10 February 1940. He served as the mayor of Rzeszów since 2002. He was honored with the medals Order of Polonia Restituta, Decoration of Honor Meritorious for Polish Culture and Badge of Honour for Merit to Local Government. 

Ferenc served as one of the establishers of politician and historian Bronisław Komorowski election committee of the 2015 Polish presidential election. He served as mayor of Rzeszów until 2021.

Ferenc died on 27 August 2022, at the age of 82.

References 

1940 births
2022 deaths
Polish economists
Polish politicians
Mayors of places in Poland
Members of the Polish Sejm 2001–2005
Democratic Left Alliance politicians
Kraków University of Economics alumni
People from Rzeszów
Recipients of the Order of Polonia Restituta
21st-century Polish politicians